Parkdale is an unincorporated community in Otter Tail County, in the U.S. state of Minnesota.

History
Parkdale was originally called Hazel Dell, and under the latter name was platted in 1876. A post office operated under the name Parkdale between 1877 and 1893.

References

Unincorporated communities in Otter Tail County, Minnesota
Unincorporated communities in Minnesota